Wilson Delgado Durán (born July 15, 1972 in San Cristobal, Dominican Republic) is a former professional baseball player who played shortstop in the major leagues from -.

Career
Delgado was originally signed in 1992 by the Seattle Mariners, but was traded in 1995 with Shawn Estes to the San Francisco Giants for Salomón Torres.

Delgado made his debut with the Giants in 1996 and played with them through 1999, compiling a .259 average over 124 plate appearances. In March 2000, Delgado was traded again, this time to the New York Yankees for Juan Melo. Delgado played in 31 games for the Yankees, before being traded in August to the Kansas City Royals for Nick Ortiz.

Delgado finished out the 2000 season with the Royals and spent all of 2001 with them, hitting .120 in 14 games. He then spent the next two seasons with the St. Louis Cardinals, hitting .175 in 55 games before the Anaheim Angels purchased his contract in 2003. He hit .320 in 58 games for the Angels, before finishing up his career with the New York Mets, hitting .292 in 42 games in 2004.

For his career, Delgado hit .251 in 601 plate appearances, with 5 home runs and 5 stolen bases.

Suspension from MLB
In , Delgado was suspended 30 games for using a banned substance and violating the Minor League drug policy.

References

External links

1972 births
Living people
Albuquerque Isotopes players
Anaheim Angels players
Appleton Foxes players
Arizona League Mariners players
Baseball players at the 2007 Pan American Games
Burlington Bees players
Dominican Republic expatriate baseball players in the United States
Dominican Republic sportspeople in doping cases
Fresno Grizzlies players
Kansas City Royals players

Major League Baseball infielders
Major League Baseball players from the Dominican Republic
Memphis Redbirds players
New York Mets players
New York Yankees players
Norfolk Tides players
Omaha Royals players
Phoenix Firebirds players
Port City Roosters players
San Francisco Giants players
San Jose Giants players
St. Louis Cardinals players
Wisconsin Timber Rattlers players
Pan American Games competitors for the Dominican Republic